Charles Spencer Lloyd (11 August 1789 – 20 June 1876) was an English first-class cricketer active 1819 to 1850 who played for Marylebone Cricket Club (MCC). He was born in Leaton Knolls, Shropshire and died in Leatherhead. Henry J. Lloyd was his brother.

References

1789 births
1876 deaths
English cricketers
Marylebone Cricket Club cricketers
Non-international England cricketers